City Football Academy may refer to:

 City Football Academy (Melbourne), headquarters of Melbourne City Football Club in Bundoora, Victoria
 City Football Academy (Montevideo), headquarters of Montevideo City Torque in Montevideo, Uruguay
 City Football Academy (New York), headquarters of New York City Football Club in Orangeburg, New York
 City Football Academy (Mumbai), headquarters of Mumbai City Football Club in Mumbai, India
 City Football Academy (CFA) training facility, at Etihad Campus, the headquarters of Manchester City Football Club
 Manchester City F.C. EDS and Academy, the academy of the club